John Jones was born on February 6, 1952, in New Orleans, Louisiana.  He held the position of president and chief operating officer of the Green Bay Packers, an NFL franchise.  He was to assume the titles of president and chief executive officer in May 2007, replacing a retiring Bob Harlan.

On May 26, 2007, the Packers announced that John Jones would be taking an indefinite "leave of absence" only days before Jones was scheduled to succeed Harlan as new CEO of the organization.  Health concerns were the major reason sited for Jones' departure. In late July 2007, the Packers and Jones officially cut ties and on December 3, 2007, the Green Bay Packers announced Mark H. Murphy as its new president and CEO.

In January 2009, Jones openly discussed his medical situation. In June 2006, Jones underwent a heart surgery operation to correct a dissected aorta, a procedure he was told later that only 10 percent of patients survive. He suffered a stroke during the surgery that continues to affect his short-term memory and his physical stamina, which ultimately caused him to leave the team.

Following his personal medical triumph, Jones' recent mission has been raising awareness about men's healthcare. His presentation "Bulletproof: The Men's Healthcare Myth" encourages men to see their physicians regularly. "Ladies get their checkups, but men are the exact opposite. They take better care of their car than their bodies."

Career highlights
Elected team's 10th president May 31, 2006, by team's board of directors. Responsible for Salary Cap supervision and management of the organization's administrative staff and business operations, including the Lambeau Field Atrium, finance, stadium operations, ticketing, public relations, marketing, community relations and retail. 
 Originally joined the organization February 10, 1999, as senior vice president of administration.
Named executive vice president and chief operating officer on October 16, 2001. 
Continued to lead the organization's solid financial performance in 2006 as the team moved up to seventh place in NFL revenue ranking, its highest ever. 
Assisted in creating a new local broadcast partnership joining WFRV-TV in Green Bay and WTMJ-TV in Milwaukee with CBS Sports and Viacom to produce Packers' preseason games, create year-round TV programming and promote economic development/tourism at Lambeau Field. 
Serves as a member on the NFL's Stadium Committee and on the board of directors of NFL Business Ventures. 
During a 10-year tenure with the NFL Management Council (NFLMC), was a member of the league's negotiating team that forged the NFL Collective Bargaining Agreement and created the salary cap system in 1993. 
Spearheaded the NFLMC's development of an intranet site on the World Wide Web in 1999 and with it a new electronic contract reporting system used by every club to report player signings by e-mail. 
Attended graduate journalism school at the University of Wisconsin–Madison, developing early ties to the Packers, leaving school in 1974 to become editor of Ray Nitschke's Packer Report, a position he held through 1975.

References

John Jones' Bio
Former Packers president Jones battles back 
Bellin Health LifeLines series at the Weidner Center 

1952 births
Living people
Sportspeople from New Orleans
National Football League team presidents
Green Bay Packers executives
Businesspeople from Louisiana
University of Wisconsin–Madison School of Journalism & Mass Communication alumni
American chief operating officers